United Nations Administered East Timor refers to the period between 25 October 1999 and 20 May 2002 when East Timor was administered by the United Nations Transitional Administration in East Timor as a United Nations protectorate.

Background

East Timor was colonised by Portugal in the mid-16th century and administered as Portuguese Timor. Following the Carnation Revolution in Portugal, East Timor unilaterally declared independence on 28 November 1975, but was invaded by Indonesia 7 December 1975. East Timor was occupied by Indonesia and administered as Timor Timur province. The invasion was not recognized as legal by the United Nations, which continued to regard Portugal as the legal Administering Power of East Timor. In 1999, in a UN-sponsored referendum, an overwhelming majority of East Timorese voted for independence from Indonesia. Immediately following the referendum, Pro-Indonesia militias commenced a scorched earth campaign triggering the 1999 East Timorese crisis. An International Force for East Timor was deployed to the territory to bring the violence to an end. Indonesia formally rescinded its annexation on 19 October 1999 and a United Nations transitional administration was subsequently established on 25 October 1999 by Security Council Resolution 1272 to administer the territory until independence on 22 May 2002.

Administrative history

Initial administrative arrangements
A National Consultative Council was established in December 1999 by UNTAET REG 1999/2, and served as a forum for East Timorese political and community leaders to advise the Transitional Administrator and discuss policy issues. The Council had eleven Timorese members and four international members. A Transitional Judicial Service Commission was also established to ensure representation of East Timorese leaders in decisions affecting the judiciary in East Timor. The Commission was made up of three Timorese representatives and two international experts.

First transitional administration
In July 2000 the membership of the National Consultative Council was expanded to 36 members including, one representative from each of the 13 districts of East Timor, and the body was renamed the National Council. All the members were now Timorese and represented the main political parties and religious communities of East Timor. The National Council became a legislature style body and had the right to debate any future regulations issued by UNTAET.

The following month an executive body, the Transitional Cabinet, was formed comprising four Timorese members and four international members.

Progress was made in the development of a judicial system with a Prosecutor General's Office and a Defender Service established. District Courts and Court of Appeal were also established.

A voter registration process was completed during this period and preparations were made for elections to a Constituent Assembly that would prepare East Timor for independence expected in 2002.

Second transitional administration
Elections for an 88-member  Constituent Assembly were held on 30 August 2001, the second anniversary of the autonomy referendum, which resulted in a plurality of seats for the Fretilin party. The Assembly nominated a transitional Council of Ministers the following month. The Council of Ministers had 24 members and was led by transitional Chief Minister Mari Alkatiri.

The Constituent Assembly completed work on a draft constitution and this was promulgated in March 2002, the Assembly would serve as the parliament of East Timor following independence.

Presidential elections were held in April in which Xanana Gusmão was elected president of a future independent East Timor.

East Timor became an independent state on 20 May 2002.

Office holders

Transitional administrator

Sérgio Vieira de Mello served as Special Representative of the Secretary-General for East Timor (Transitional Administrator) during the period East Timor was administered by the United Nations.

Chief minister

Mari Alkatiri served as Chief Minister of East Timor between September 2001 and May 2002.

Elections
The following elections were held during United Nations administration:
2001 East Timorese parliamentary election
2002 East Timorese presidential election

Local government

During the period of United Nations administration, East Timor was divided into thirteen districts:

Each district was headed by an UNTAET appointed District Administrator supported by District Advisory Councils with representation from political parties, the Catholic Church, women and youth groups.

Security and law enforcement
Security was initially provided by the International Force for East Timor (INTERFET) but was assumed by UNTAET Peace-Keeping Force (PKF) in February 2000. The formation of an East Timor Defence Force was approved in September 2000 which was formally established in February 2001. The East Timorese pro-independence guerrilla movement FALINTIL was officially disbanded as this time with many of its members joining the new defence force.

Initially law and order in East Timor was maintained by an international United Nations Civilian Police Force (CIVPOL). Recruitment and training for a local police force commenced by UNTAET in April 2000 and an East Timor Police Service was established in August 2001. Prisons were established at Dili, Becora and Gleno. A Serious Crimes Unit and Crime Scene Detachment also existed to investigate human rights abuses during the period of Indonesian occupation and its immediate aftermath.

International relations

Liaison Offices

The following countries opened Liaison offices in East Timor during the period of United Nations administration:

Sport
Four East Timorese athletes participated in the 2000 Summer Olympics and two athletes participated in the 2000 Summer Paralympics in Sydney.

Media and communications

UNTAET public information
The UN-led interim administration maintained a local FM radio station, "Radio UNTAET", and published a fortnightly newsletter known as "Tais Timor" in English, Portuguese, Tetum and Indonesian.

Postal services

The United Nations transitional administration established an East Timor Postal Service in April 2000 with post offices opening in Dili, Baucau and at Comoro Airport. Two postage stamps with the inscription Timor Lorosae / UNTAET were first issued on 29 April 2000, in red for domestic mail and blue for international mail.

Telecommunications

Portuguese Timor used the international dialing code +672 until 1975. During Indonesian occupation, the Indonesian country code +62 was used. The code +672 was subsequently reassigned to the Australian External Territories. Initially after the end of Indonesian occupation, the code +672 9 was used following an agreement with the Government of Australia and telecommunications provider Telstra. East Timor was later assigned the code +670.

See also
 United Nations Transitional Administration in East Timor
 International Force for East Timor
List of territories governed by the United Nations
United Nations Administered Kosovo

References

External links

 Archived web-site of first Transitional Administration
 Archived web-site of second Transitional Administration
 Archived UNTAET website
 UNTAET Legislation

 01
Government of East Timor
History of East Timor
1990s in East Timor
2000s in East Timor
States and territories established in 1999
States and territories disestablished in 2002
1990s establishments in East Timor
2000s disestablishments in East Timor
1999 establishments in Indonesia
1999 establishments in Southeast Asia
2002 disestablishments in Southeast Asia
1267
History of Timor
East Timor and the United Nations